Thomas Byrne (11 July 1866 – 19 December 1951) was an Australian cricketer. He played in seventeen first-class matches for Queensland between 1896 and 1906.

See also
 List of Queensland first-class cricketers

References

External links
 

1866 births
1951 deaths
Australian cricketers
Queensland cricketers
Cricketers from New South Wales